Theobald Dillon, 1st Viscount Dillon (died 1624), was an Irish military commander and adventurer. He held extensive lands in eastern Connacht and north-western Leinster, some acquired by sharp practices. He was a loyal supporter of Elizabeth I of England in her Irish wars.

Birth and origins 
Theobald was probably born at Ballynakill, the habitual home of his father and grandfather. He was the third son of Thomas Dillon and his wife Margery Dillon of Kilmore, also called Mary. His father was the eldest son of his grandfather James Dillon, nicknamed the Prior, because he took care of several monastic properties at the dissolution of the monasteries. His father's side of the family descended from Lord Dillon of Drumraney, County Westmeath. Theobald's mother was a daughter of Christopher Dillon of Kilmore. His father's family like his mother's family were branches of the same widespread Old English family that descends from Sir Henry Dillon who came to Ireland with Prince John in 1185.

{{Tree chart|GrdDl|y|Ismay|boxstyle=border-width: 1px; border-radius: 0.5em;
 |GrdDl=GeraldDillon
 |Ismay=IsmayTuite}}

In 1559 Theobald commanded an independent force.

 Marriage and children 
Theobald Dillon married Eleanor Tuite. So far the sources agree. However, she is either the widow or the daughter of William Tuite according to sources.

Theobald and Eleanor had 19 children, eight sons:
Christopher (died 28 February 1624), the eldest, married the eldest daughter of James Dillon, 1st Earl of Roscommon and became the father of the 2nd Viscount and the 4th Viscount
Lucas (1579–1656), ancestor of the 7th and later viscounts
William, denominated of Tolchan
Thomas, denominated of Brackloon
Edward, became a Franciscan monk
George, also became a Franciscan monk
John, became an officer in the army and died unmarried
James (c. 1600 – in or after 1669), the 8th and youngest son, who became an army officer

—and 11 daughters:
Rose, died young
Margaret, married Robert Dillon of Cannestown, son of Thomas Dillon, who was a brother of Lucas Dillon, the judge
Anne, married John, Viscount Taaffe, and was the mother of Theobald Taaffe, 1st Earl of Carlingford
Katherine, married Sir Ulick Burke of Glinsk, 1st Baronet
Mary, married Gerald Pettyt of Mullingar in County Westmeath
Elizabeth, married Thomas Fitzgerald of Newcastle in County Longford
Jane, married Hugh O'Conor of Castlereagh
Eleanor (died 1629), became a nun with the Poor Clares
Cecily (c. 1603 – 1653), became the first Abbess of the Poor Clares in Ireland
Bridget, died unmarried
Barbara, died unmarried

 Later life 
In 1582 in the context of the Composition of Connacht, a surrender and regrant action, Dillon was appointed collector-general of the composition money in Connacht and Thomond. During this period of the English reconquest in Connacht, Dillon was involved in some sharp practices with the local landholders. In particular, he persuaded the various Costello freeholders of the Barony of Costello in eastern County Mayo, to save expense and ensure the smooth legal transfer, to allow him to surrender their lands for them in one land-title in the Surrender and regrant process and had it regranted in his own name, becoming the legal landowner in the process. He never returned this title to the lands to the native owners, which would lead to rapparee actions by Dudley Costello (or Costellogh) against the Dillons in the 1660s.

He fought under the Earl of Essex in the Nine Years' War (1593–1603) and was knighted by him on 24 July 1599. To put this into perspective it should be said that Theobald was already in his sixties and that Essex knighted a great many people and was mocked by saying "he never drew sword but to make knights".

On 19 July 1608, King James I gave him a patent confirming the possession of the manor and town of Kilfaughny in County Westmeath where he then lived and finally died.

On 16 March 1622, King James I created him Viscount Dillon of Costello-Gallen''', cementing his legal title. He became the first of a long succession of viscounts Dillon. The territorial designation "Costello-Gallen" refers to the baronies of Gallen and Costello in County Mayo.

Lord Dillon, as he now was, held the title of Lord President of Connaught from c. 1621 on, which he shared with Charles Wilmot, who held that same title from 1616 to 1644.

Death, succession, and timeline 
Lord Dillon died on 15 March 1624 in Kilfaughny in County Westmeath. It is said that he died "at so advanced an age, that at one time he had the satisfaction of seeing above an hundred of his descendants in his house of Killenfaghny". Christopher, his eldest son, died on 28 February about two weeks before his father and therefore never succeeded his father. On the first Viscount's death, the title, therefore, passed to his grandson Lucas, Christopher's eldest son.

Notes and references

Notes

Citations

Sources 

  – Abdy to Hutchinson (for Dillon)
 
 
  – Dacre to Dysart (for Dillon)
  – Scotland and Ireland
  – (for timeline)
 
  – Viscounts (for Dillon)
 
 
 
 

1624 deaths
16th-century births
16th-century Irish people
17th-century Irish people
Irish people of French descent
Irish soldiers
Peers of Ireland created by James I
People from County Westmeath
People of Elizabethan Ireland
Theobald 01